Diego Andrade may refer to:

 Diego Andrade Silva Bispo (born 1989), Brazilian footballer
 Diego Andrade (footballer) (born 1992), Mexican footballer
 Diego Andrade (politician) (born 1977), Brazilian politician